Pirch (stylized as PIRCH) is a fixture and appliance retailer for kitchen, bath and outdoor products based in San Diego, California. Founded in 2009, the company expanded to ten metropolitan markets throughout the United States before pulling back to its four California stores in 2017. The stores feature an experiential showroom that allows consumers to test living appliances and bathroom plumbing fixtures as they would in their homes, while being advised by sales consultants.

History
The company was founded in San Diego in 2009 by a team of businessmen including Phil Roxworthy, James Fikes, and Tom Cavallo, under Rox Design DBA Fixtures Kitchen Bath Outdoor. 
 
On February 26, 2013, the private equity firm Catterton Partners announced its investment in Pirch as a minority shareholder. 
 
In September 2017 the company announced a change of focus, closing all its stores outside of California.

References

2009 establishments in California
Companies based in San Diego
Home appliance manufacturers of the United States
Privately held companies based in California
Retail companies based in California
Retail companies established in 2009